Pilot Township may refer to:

Pilot Township, Kankakee County, Illinois
Pilot Township, Vermilion County, Illinois
Pilot Township, Cherokee County, Iowa
Pilot Township, Iowa County, Iowa
Pilot Township, Surry County, North Carolina

Township name disambiguation pages